Tosyl azide is a reagent used in organic synthesis.

Uses
Tosyl azide is used for the introduction of azide and diazo functional groups.  It is also used as a nitrene source and as a substrate for [3+2] cycloaddition reactions.

Preparation
Tosyl azide can be prepared by the reaction of tosyl chloride with sodium azide in aqueous acetone.

Safety
Tosyl azide is one of the most stable azide compounds but is still regarded as a potential explosive and should be carefully stored, while particular caution is vital for all reactions in which it is heated at or above 100 °C. The initial temperature of the explosive decomposition is about 120 °C.

See also
 Diphenylphosphoryl azide
 Trifluoromethanesulfonyl azide

References

Azido compounds
Reagents for organic chemistry
p-Tosyl compounds